is a Japanese football player who plays for Albirex Niigata.

Career
Takumi Hasegawa joined the J1 League club Albirex Niigata in 2016. On May 18, he debuted in the J.League Cup against Kashiwa Reysol.

Club statistics
Updated to end of 2020 season.

References

External links
Profile at Albirex Niigata

1998 births
Living people
Association football people from Niigata Prefecture
Japanese footballers
J1 League players
J2 League players
Albirex Niigata players
Zweigen Kanazawa players
Association football defenders